Régis Brouard (born 17 January 1967) is a French football manager and former professional footballer who played as a midfielder. He is the manager of Bastia.

Coaching career
Brouard was appointed as head coach of Red Star, newly relegated to the French third tier, for the 2017–18 season. He was fired by Red Star on 29 October 2018 He led the club to promotion to second tier and National title after one season in charge. 

In August 2019, he joined Luxembourgish club Racing FC Union Luxembourg, signing a two year contract. His stated aim was to win the championship.

On 2 October 2021, Brouard was hired by Ligue 2 club Bastia.

References

External links
Régis Brouard profile at chamoisfc79.fr

1967 births
Living people
French footballers
Association football midfielders
Ligue 1 players
Ligue 2 players
Rodez AF players
Montpellier HSC players
Chamois Niortais F.C. players
Stade Malherbe Caen players
Nîmes Olympique players
AS Cannes players
Bourges 18 players
French football managers
Rodez AF managers
Nîmes Olympique managers
Clermont Foot managers
Chamois Niortais F.C. managers
A.F.C. Tubize managers
Union Luxembourg managers
SC Bastia managers
Ligue 2 managers
Championnat National managers